Elizabeth Wambui (born 1998) is a Kenyan footballer who plays as a midfielder for Gaspo Women FC and the Kenya women's national team.

International career
Wambui capped for Kenya at senior level during the 2020 CAF Women's Olympic Qualifying Tournament (second round).

See also
List of Kenya women's international footballers

References

1998 births
Living people
People from Murang'a
Kenyan women's footballers
Women's association football midfielders
Kenya women's international footballers